The following lists detail World Heritage Sites in Ireland:

 List of World Heritage Sites in the Republic of Ireland
 List of World Heritage Sites in the United Kingdom, including one site in Northern Ireland: the Giant's Causeway

World Heritage Sites in Ireland